Pavel Yevgenyevich Derevyagin (born 9 January 1996) is a Russian football player.

Club career
He made his debut in the Russian Professional Football League for FC Dynamo Saint Petersburg on 5 October 2015 in a game against FC Volga Tver.

He made his Russian Football National League debut for FC Mordovia Saransk on 4 August 2018 in a game against FC SKA-Khabarovsk.

References

External links
 Profile by Russian Professional Football League

1996 births
People from Livny
Living people
Russian footballers
Association football defenders
FC Dynamo Saint Petersburg players
FC Mordovia Saransk players
FC Sportakademklub Moscow players
Sportspeople from Oryol Oblast